Plutodes costatus is a moth of the family Geometridae first described by Arthur Gardiner Butler in 1886. It is found in India, Sikkim, Nepal and China.

External links
Checklist of Hong Kong Fauna

Plutodini